The following is a list of TV programs for the American channel Syfy, including both original and acquired programming.

Current programming
The following programs first aired in their entirety or had specific seasons on American Syfy channel. Programs running on the present schedule are listed below.

Drama

Comedy

Co-productions

In development
Death Is My BFF
Nightbreed

Former programming

Drama

Comedy

Anthology

Miniseries

Adult animation

Unscripted

Docuseries

Game shows

Reality

Variety

Sports

Syfy original films

Syfy second-run programming

Current programming
 Battlestar Galactica (2000s-present)
 Gary and His Demons (2019–present)
 Quantum Leap (2000s-present)
 The Twilight Zone (1995–present)
 Xena: Warrior Princess (2000s-present)

Former programming
Many of the following series used to be aired frequently on S.C.I.F.I. World, a daytime programming schedule started on in July 2000, that divided its marathons into five days that concentrated on five particular themes:Superheroland, Creatureland, Intergalacticland, Fantasticland and Inhumanland.

 The 4400
 The Adventures of Superman
 Alfred Hitchcock Presents
 Alien Nation
 All Souls
 The Amazing Spider-Man
 Amazing Stories
 The Anti-Gravity Room
 Automan
 Babylon 5
 Back to the Future
 Bates Motel
 Batman
 Beakman's World
 Beastmaster
 Beauty and the Beast
 Beyond Belief: Fact or Fiction
 Beyond Reality
 Bionic Six
 The Bionic Woman
 Brimstone
 Buck Rogers in the 25th Century
 Cable in the Classroom
 Captain Simian & the Space Monkeys
 Captain Scarlet and the Mysterons
 Charmed
 Cleopatra 2525
 Code Name: Eternity
 The Crow: Stairway to Heaven
 Crusade
 Dark Angel
 Dark Shadows
 Dark Shadows (1991 series)
 Dark Skies
 Darkroom
 Dead Like Me
 Defenders of the Earth
 Doctor Who (Classic; 1974 to 1978))
 Early Edition
 Earth 2
 Earth: Final Conflict
 The End Is Nye
 Extreme Ghostbusters
 The Fantastic Journey
 Fantastic Voyage
 Fantasy Island
 Firefly
 Friday the 13th: The Series
 Forever Knight
 Futurama (2019–21)
 Future Cop
 Galactica 1980
 Galaxy High School
 Gargoyles
 Gemini Man
 Ghost Whisperer
 Golden Years
 Grave Times
 The Green Hornet
 Hammer House of Horror
 Hammer House of Mystery and Suspense
 Haunted
 Hercules: The Legendary Journeys
 Here Comes the Grump
 Heroes Reborn
 H.G. Wells’ The Invisible Man
 Harley Quinn
 Highlander
 Highlander: The Raven
 The Hitchhiker
 The Hitchhiker's Guide to the Galaxy
 The Immortal
 The Incredible Hulk
 In Search of...
 Intergalatic
 Inside Space
 The Invaders
 The Invisible Man
 Jake 2.0
 Joe 90
 John Doe
 Journey to the Center of the Earth
 Jumanji
 Kindred: The Embraced
 King Arthur and the Knights of Justice
 Knight Rider
 Kolchak: The Night Stalker
 Kraft Suspense Theatre
 Land of the Giants
 Land of the Lost
 The Last Kingdom
 Lazer Patrol
 Level 9
 Little Shop
 Lost in Space
 The Magician
 Manifest
 Manimal
 Mann & Machine
 Master Blasters
 Max Headroom
 Misfits of Science
 Monsters
 Moonbase 3
 Moonlight
 Mork & Mindy
 My Secret Identity
 Mysteries from Beyond the Other Dominion
 The New Adventures of Flash Gordon
 The New Adventures of Gigantor
 Night Gallery (syndicated series, including episodes of The Sixth Sense)
 Night Stalker
 Night Visions
 Nightmare Cafe
 Now and Again
 Odyssey 5
 One Step Beyond
 Otherworld
 The Outer Limits (1963 Series)
 Passions
 The Phoenix
 Planet of the Apes
 The Powers of Matthew Star
 Prey
 Primeval
 The Prisoner
 Probe
 The Ray Bradbury Theater
 Raze
 Return to the Planet of the Apes
 Ripley's Believe It or Not! (1982 and 2000 Series)
 Roar
 RoboCop: The Series
 Robotech
 Roswell
 Roswell Conspiracies: Aliens, Myths and Legends
 The Science Show
 SciFi Buzz
 SciFi Declassified
 SciFi Trader
 SeaQuest DSV
 The Sentinel
 Seven Days
 She-Wolf of London
 The Six Million Dollar Man
 Skysurfer Strike Force
 Something Is Out There
 Sonic Underground
 Space: 1999
 Space: Above and Beyond
 Space Precinct
 Special Unit 2
 Stargate Infinity
 Starman
 Star Trek
 Star Trek: The Animated Series
 Star Trek: Enterprise
 Star Trek: The Next Generation
 Star Wars: Droids
 Star Wars: Ewoks
 Stingray
 Strange World
 Swamp Thing
 Swamp Thing: The Animated Series
 Tales from the Crypt
 Tales from the Darkside
 TekWar
 Terrahawks
 Timecop
 Threshold
 The Time Tunnel
 Tracker
 The Transformers
 Thriller
 Thunderbirds
 Tru Calling
 The Twilight Zone
 UFO
 V
 Viper
 The Visitor
 Voyage to the Bottom of the Sea
 Voyagers!
 War of the Worlds
 Weird Science
 Wolf Lake
 Wonder Woman
 The X-Files
 Zoey's Extraordinary Playlist

TZGZ second-run animated programming
 The Alien Guide to Earth
 Brogan: Master of Castles
 The Cyanide & Happiness Show
 Dallas & Robo
 Don't Feed the Humans
 Purgatony

Other second-run programming
 Beyond Belief: Fact or Fiction
 Chuck
 CSI: Crime Scene Investigation
 Departure
 Heroes
 Law & Order: Special Victims Unit (Four episodes aired on one night. All were related to serial killers.)
 Lost
 NCIS: Los Angeles
 Passions
 Spartacus
 Surface

Movie marathons
 Made in Columbia Pictures (Labor Day)
 Godzilla's Thanksgiving Showdown (Thanksgiving and Black Friday)
 Twas the Fight...: A Marathon of Kaiju Movies (Christmas Eve and Christmas)
 Have a Sci-fi New Years! (New Year's Eve and New Year's Day)

Anime shown on Syfy
 

For most of the 1990s, Syfy showed anime films, although they had to be edited in order to be shown on basic cable. The channel's longest running animation block, referred to as Saturday Anime, aired at the start of the channel's broadcast day each Saturday morning. In 2007, Syfy reintroduced anime to their programming via the "Ani-Monday" block. In 2008 the block was shifted to Tuesday; in 2010, to Thursday; and after June 9, 2011, disappeared abruptly, along with the Anime section of the Syfy.com website. Licensors that have supported this block included Streamline Pictures, Central Park Media, Manga Entertainment USA, and Geneon Entertainment USA among others. The licensor that has aired it on the block is shown after the title.

 8 Man After (Streamline Pictures)
 Adieu Galaxy Express 999 (Viz Media)
 Akira (Streamline Pictures dub) (Streamline Pictures)
 Appleseed (Geneon Entertainment USA)
 Appleseed (OVA) (Manga Entertainment USA)
 Armitage III: Poly-Matrix (Geneon Entertainment USA)
 Black Jack: The Movie (Manga Entertainment USA)
 Black Magic M-66 (Manga Entertainment USA)
 Casshan: Robot Hunter (Streamline Pictures)
 Chrono Crusade (ADV Films)
 Dead Leaves (Manga Entertainment USA)
 Demon City Shinjuku (Central Park Media)
 Descendants of Darkness (Central Park Media)
 Dominion: Tank Police (edited) (Central Park Media)
 E.Y.E.S. of Mars (Streamline Pictures)
 Ergo Proxy (Manglobe)
 Fatal Fury: The Motion Picture (Viz Media)
 Final Fantasy: The Spirits Within (Sony Pictures)
 Galaxy Express 999 (Viz Media)
 Gall Force: Eternal Story (Central Park Media)
 Ghost in the Shell (Manga Entertainment USA)
 Ghost in the Shell: Stand Alone Complex - Solid State Society (Manga Entertainment USA)
 Green Legend Ran (Geneon Entertainment USA)
 Gurren Lagann (Bandai Entertainment)
 Highlander: The Search for Vengeance (Manga Entertainment USA)
 Iria: Zeiram the Animation (Central Park Media)
 Kai Doh Maru (Manga Entertainment USA)
 Karas: The Prophecy (Manga Entertainment USA)
 Karas: The Revelation (Manga Entertainment USA)
 Lensman (Streamline Pictures)
 Lily C.A.T. (Streamline Pictures)
 Macross Plus (Manga Entertainment USA)
 MD Geist (Central Park Media)
 MD Geist II: Death Force (Central Park Media)
 Mobile Suit Gundam 00 (Bandai Entertainment)
 Monster (Viz Media)
 Monster Rancher (BKN)
 Negadon: The Monster from Mars (Central Park Media)
 The New Adventures of Gigantor (Streamline Pictures)
 Ninja Scroll (Manga Entertainment USA)
 Noein: To Your Other Self (Manga Entertainment USA)
 Now and Then, Here and There (Central Park Media)
 Odin - Starlight Mutiny (Central Park Media)
 Perfect Blue (Manga Entertainment USA)
 Project A-ko (Central Park Media)
 Project A-ko: Grey Side/Blue Side (Central Park Media)
 Psychic Wars (Manga Entertainment USA)
 Rave Master (Tokyopop)
 Read or Die (OVA) (Manga Entertainment USA)
 Record of Lodoss War (1990 OVA series, first three episodes only) (Central Park Media)
 Robot Carnival (Streamline Pictures)
 Roujin Z (Central Park Media)
 Star Blazers: The Quest for Iscandar (Voyager Entertainment) 
 Strait Jacket (Manga Entertainment USA)
 Street Fighter Alpha: The Animation (Manga Entertainment USA)
 Street Fighter Alpha: Generations (Manga Entertainment USA)
 Street Fighter II: The Animated Movie (Manga Entertainment USA)
 Street Fighter II V (Manga Entertainment USA)
 Sword for Truth (Manga Entertainment USA)
 Tactics (Manga Entertainment USA)
 Tenchi the Movie: Tenchi Muyo in Love (Geneon Entertainment USA)
 Tenjho Tenge (TV Asahi)
 Tokko (Manga Entertainment USA)
 Urusei Yatsura 2: Beautiful Dreamer (Central Park Media)
 Vampire Hunter D (1985 film) (Urban Vision)
 Vampire Wars (Manga Entertainment USA)
 Venus Wars (Central Park Media)
 Virus Buster Serge (Manga Entertainment USA)
 The Wicked and the Damned: A Hundred Tales of Karma (Geneon Entertainment USA)
 X (Manga Entertainment USA)

Other programming

 13: Fear Is Real
 666 Park Avenue
 AHHH Zombies
 Alfred Hitchcock Presents (1985 series)
 All Souls
 American Gothic
 The American Scream
 Apparitions
 Beauty and the Beast
 Beyond Belief: Fact or Fiction
 Black Blood Brothers
 Brimstone
 Buffy the Vampire Slayer
 Can You Survive a Horror Movie?
 Children of Darkness
 Chiller 13: The Decade's Scariest Movie Moments
 Chiller 13: Horror's Creepiest Kids
 Dark Realm
 Dead Like Me
 Descendants of Darkness
 Devil May Cry: The Animated Series
 Fear Factor
 Forever Knight
 FreakyLinks
 Freddy's Nightmares
 Friday the 13th: The Series
 The Future of Fear
 The Gates
 Ghost Whisperer
 Ghoul
 Harper's Island
 Haunted
 Hex
 The Hunger
 Is This a Zombie?
 Invasion
 Kindred: The Embraced
 Kolchak: The Night Stalker
 Masters of Horror
 Millennium
 Monster
 Monsters
 Most Daring
 Night Gallery
 Night Stalker
 Night Visions
 Nightmare Cafe
 The Nightmare Room
 The Others
 The Outer Limits
 Persons Unknown
 Profit
 Pushing Daisies
 Real Fear
 Real Fear: The Truth Behind the Movies
 Ripley's Believe It Or Not!
 Scary... But True!
 Sea of Souls
 The Secret Circle
 The Sixth Sense
 Slasher
 Spine Chillers
 Steve Niles' Remains
 Strange
 Strange World
 Tales from the Crypt
 Tales from the Darkside
 Todd and the Book of Pure Evil
 Tokko
 Tokyo Majin
 Tru Calling
 The Twilight Zone (1985 series)
 Twin Peaks
 Unexplained Mysteries
 War of the Worlds
 Werewolf
 Wolf Lake
 World's Most Amazing Videos
 The X-Files

Announced, unrealized projects
2002
 The Chronicles of Amber: Four-hour miniseries based on Roger Zelazny's 10-volume series, scripted by Richard Christian Matheson, with Tom Patricia of Patriarch Pictures as executive producer.
 Colosseum: made-for-TV-movie in which modern-day fight promoter Tommy Pettigrew finds himself transported in time to the Colosseum of Rome in the year AD 95, with a script by Sam Egan. Directed by Mario Philip Azzopardi and executive produced by Egan, Azzopardi, and Matt Loze.
 The Forever War: Four-hour miniseries, scripted by John Fasano and based on Joe Haldeman's novel of that name. Executive producers were Richard Edlund, along with Peter Sussman and Ed Gernon for Alliance Atlantis.
 Myst: Four-hour miniseries based on the video game Myst. A Mandalay Television Pictures production, executive produced by Elizabeth Stephen with Rand Miller and Susan Bonds of Cyan, in association with Columbia Tri Star Domestic Television and distributed through USA Cable Entertainment.
 On the Seventh Day: Seven-hour miniseries set in 2850 in an overcrowded world in which the government has assigned people one day a week to live, while spending the remaining six days in Cryopreservation, from writer and executive producer Gary Sherman and USA Cable Entertainment.
 Quantum Leap: Syfy announced development of a two-hour television film based on Quantum Leap that would have served as a backdoor pilot for a possible new series, with series creator Donald P. Bellisario returning as executive producer. 
2003
 1000 Days: A live-action made-for-TV-movie and backdoor pilot based on the Marvel Comics series Strikeforce: Morituri, about near-future soldiers who gain enhanced abilities but die 1,000 days later. Written by Art Marcum and Matt Holloway, it was a Reveille Productions and Marvel Studios co-production executive produced by Reveille head Ben Silverman and Marvel Studios' Avi Arad and Rick Ungar.
 Alien Blood: TV-movie of a human rebellion when an invading alien army demands that one million people be sacrificed. Produced by UFO Films.
 Brother Voodoo: A live-action made-for-TV-movie and backdoor pilot based on the Marvel Comics supernatural character Brother Voodoo. Hans Rodionoff was announced to write the screenplay, set in New Orleans, of this Reveille Productions and Marvel Studios co-production executive produced by Reveille head Ben Silverman and Marvel Studios' Avi Arad and Rick Ungar.
 Dead Rail: A made-for-TV-movie set aboard a bullet train headed to Las Vegas on its inaugural run, and a detective who must battle hostile aliens. Written by Brian Smith, "founder of SciFi.com's Seeing Ear Theatre", and produced by Glow Worm.
 The Twelve: A miniseries, based on a concept by David Pirie, about an FBI agent who finds evidence that the world will end on the twelfth day of Christmas. With Martin Scorsese and producer Barbara De Fina as executive producers, with Cappa/De Fina Productions in conjunction with Adrian Bate and Zenith Entertainment Ltd., it was scheduled to debut in December 2005.

2004
 Kyra: David Twohy, co-screenwriter and director of Pitch Black and writer-director of its sequels The Chronicles of Riddick and Riddick, said in June 2004 he was writing the story basis for a Sci-Fi Channel made-for-TV-movie pilot based on the Riddick character Kyra.

2005
 Barbarian Chronicles: A half-hour animated ensemble comedy show created by Brendon Small. To be co-produced by David Letterman's Worldwide Pants production company.
 Dallas in Wonderland: A half-hour reality series hosted by Dallas Campbell, where he attempts to succeed at a series of sci Fi challenges.
 Heroes Anonymous: A live-action show based on the Bongo Comics comic about a group of superheroes that start a support group.
 Seriously Baffling Mysteries: A half-hour mockumentary hosted by Jonathan Frankle, which goes in search of the paranormal on a shoestring budget.
 Those Who Walk In Darkness: A live-action adaptation of the novel of the same name by John Ridley.
 Time Tunnel: A remake of the 1960s ABC sci-fi series The Time Tunnel. Co-produced with Fox Television Studios and Kevin Burns and Jon Jashni of Synthesis Entertainment. Written by John Turman.
 Tomorrow's Child: A series about a girl who received extraordinary powers after being saved by an alien. Produced by NBC Universal Television Studio and Gary Foster's Horseshoe Bay Productions.
 Urban Arcana: A live-action series based on the role-playing game. Aron Coleite was to write and Gary A. Randall and Rockne S. O'Bannon were to produce in association with Fox Television Studios.
 "Return of The Thing": A planned four-hour mini-series that would've served as a sequel to John Carpenter's 1982 horror classic The Thing (1982 film). Frank Darabont was on board as an executive producer on the series, which would have taken place in both Antarctica and a small town in New Mexico. Though the project fell through, concept art and a screenplay was released.

2018
 Tremors: On November 28, 2015, it was reported that Universal Television and Blumhouse Productions were developing a new Tremors TV series and that Kevin Bacon would reprise his role of Valentine McKee for the first time in the series since the first movie. In August 2017, it was announced that Vincenzo Natali would direct the pilot which would be written by showrunner Andrew Miller with filming taking place from late October 2017 through November 2017. On April 28, 2018, it was announced that Syfy had passed on the pilot.

2019
 Cipher: In January 2019, it was announced that Syfy had given the AI drama project a pilot order with Universal Content Productions. The pilot was directed by Peter Hoar and written by Allison Miller who also served as executive producer. It was later reported that Syfy had passed on the project.
 (Future) Cult Classic: In January 2019, it was announced that Syfy had given the dark comedy project a pilot order with Universal Content Productions. The pilot was directed by Tim Kirkby and written by Shay Hatten, both of whom served as executive producers. It was later reported that Syfy had passed on the project.

See also
 List of programmes broadcast by Syfy (British and Irish TV channel)
 List of science fiction comedy films
 List of science fiction television programs
 Chiller

References

Notes

Sources
 Syfy's Original Movies
 Syfy's Schedule
 The Inner Mind's Sci-Fi Channel schedule lists — dates as far back as 1994 and then some

 
 
Sci Fi Channel